Ultrahuman is a health-tech company that is headquartered in Bangalore, India.

The company has two products. Ultrahuman M1 (continuous glucose monitor) that tracks glucose levels in real time. Ultrahuman ring, a wearable that tracks sleep, movement and recovery. The combined data is accessed on an app that's available on the Play Store and App Store.

The company was founded by Mohit Kumar & Vatsal Singhal in 2019.

As of 2022, Ultrahuman was valued at $55 million.

History

2021 
In January 2021, Ultrahuman launched its app at CES in Los Angeles. The app contained a series of home workouts, meditations, soundscapes, music and bedtime stories.

In June 2021, it launched a continuous glucose monitor called Ultrahuman M1 (formerly known as Ultrahuman Cyborg). The product was launched with an invite-based waitlist where a selected cohort got access to the platform.

2022 
In April 2022, Ultrahuman acquired LazyCo - a consumer-focused wearables company. LazyCo built hardware products like an AI-powered smart ring designed to predict and automate daily tasks.

In June 2022, the health-tech app extended its operations to the United Arab Emirates with Anwar Shaikh, who was previously involved in bringing F1 to the UAE region.

In July 2022, Ultrahuman launched the smart ring to track sleep, movement and recovery.

Funding 
Ultrahuman raised $7.5M in its seed round from Nexus Venture Partners & Blume Ventures

In their Series A round, Ultrahuman raised $17.5M in funding from Alpha Wave Incubation (AWI), which is backed by DisruptAD and managed by Falcon Edge, Steadview Capital, Nexus Venture Partners, Blume Ventures and iSeed fund.

Balaji Srinivasan (ex-Coinbase), Nithin Kamath (founder of Zerodha via Rainmatter), Kunal Shah (founder of CRED), Preethi Kasireddy (ex-a16z), Akshay BD (founding team Uber India) and Tanmay Bhat (celebrity content creator and investor) along with several others, have invested in Ultrahuman.

The company has raised over $25 million to date.

Locations & Operations 
The start-up has its headquarters in Bengaluru, India, and its second office in Abu Dhabi.

It has around 85 employees as of 2022.

Accolades 

 2021: 'Best of Fitness Tech at CES 2021' by Business Insider.
 2022:  Ranked 19th in the 2022 LinkedIn top startups list

References

External links 
 Official site